Danny Sue Nolan (February 28, 1923 – August 3, 2002) was an American film actress. She made approximately 35 film and television appearances between 1949 and 1988 and had a starring role in a 1949 film, Flame of Youth. She was sometimes credited as Danni Sue Nolan, Dani Nolan, or Dani Sue Hilton.

Career
Nolan is familiar to modern viewers for her role as the accidentally declothed neighbor Gertie Duggan in the Three Stooges film Gents in a Jam. She also had many bit parts in several television shows such as I Love Lucy, The Brady Bunch, The Fugitive and The Donna Reed Show. She played Miss Bachrach, a receptionist at the Daily Planet in an episode of Adventures with Superman.

Personal
Nolan was married to television director/producer William Asher from 1951 to 1961. They had two children.

Nolan married James Albert Talley of on August 8, 1994. She and Talley lived in Palm Springs, California until her death from a stroke on August 3, 2002, at age 79.

Filmography

References

External links

American film actresses
1923 births
2002 deaths
Actresses from Denver
20th-century American actresses